Los Solidarios (“Solidarity”), also known as Crisol (“Crucible”), was a Spanish anarchist armed-struggle group founded in 1922 in Barcelona, as a reply to the dirty war strategy used by the employers and government against trade unions.

Los Solidarios

Los Solidarios was created as a successor of a previous group called Los Justicieros (“The Avengers”), created in San Sebastian by Durruti and local anarchists such as Ruiz, Aldabatrecu, Marcelino del Campo or Suberviola. The group was integrated by anarcho syndicalists, and it set up a network in order to buy and store guns, with which to eliminate members of the Sindicatos Libres, (“Free Trade Unions”), an employer-obeying organization. Los Solidarios are considered responsible for bank robberies, such as the Bank of Spain Robbery (September 1923), and for the murder of the Zaragoza cardinal Juan Soldevilla y Romero (1923). After that, and pressured by the Primo de Rivera dictatorship, Durruti, Francisco Ascaso and other members fled to France, and then to Latin America, where they were charged with more robberies. They returned to Europe, settled down in France, and were charged with the attempted assassination of Alfonso XIII on a visit to Paris, so they had to live clandestinely. They were expelled from France and settled down in Belgium, where they were allowed to stay. With the advent of the Spanish Second Republic (1931), some of the members that had been able to return to Catalonia decided to enter the Federación Anarquista Ibérica (FAI) (“Iberian Anarchist Federation”), as a group called Nosotros (“Us”), holding more radical points of view than those of the FAI itself. When the Spanish Civil War broke out, the group dissolved as such, but they kept working inside the FAI.

Juan García Oliver, member of Los Solidarios, stated in a speech, whose recording has survived, that the members of the group, were the best working-class terrorists and "the kings of Barcelona's workers' militia", the ones with the best chance to strike back against the “white terrorism” directed towards workers by the employers, such as the murders of Salvador Seguí and Francesc Layret .

Members
Some of the members of “Los Solidarios” were:

Juan García Oliver 
Aurelio Fernández Sánchez
Buenaventura Durruti 
Francisco Ascaso 
Antonio Ortiz Ramírez 
Ramona Berni i Toldrà
Gregorio Jover 
Antonio Martín Escudero 
Miguel García Vivancos 
Pepita Not 
Rafael Torres Escartín 
Ricardo Sanz García
Francesc Sabaté Llopart
María Luisa Tejedor

Legacy
Singer-songwriter Chicho Sánchez Ferlosio wrote a song called “Homenaje a Los Solidarios” (“Homage to Los Solidarios”), about the group.

Notes

References 
.
.
 Paz, Abel, Durruti, le peuple en armes. París, Tête de Feuille, 1972.

Terrorism in Spain
Anarchist organisations in Spain
Defunct anarchist militant groups
Illegalism
Left-wing militant groups in Spain
Defunct anarchist organizations in Europe